Stretching across the Euphrates in the tiny Iraqi village of Jurf Al Sakhar southwest of Baghdad, the 4-lane Jurf Al Sakhar Bridge was a primary target of Operation Phantom Fury in November 2004.

According to US Central Command, the bridge was a key pathway for insurgents crossing between Baghdad and Fallujah.

References

Bridges in Iraq
Bridges over the Euphrates River